Moffett Glacier is a tributary glacier,  long, flowing east from Rawson Plateau to enter Amundsen Glacier just south of Mount Benjamin, in the Queen Maud Mountains of Antarctica. it was discovered by Rear Admiral Richard E. Byrd on the South Pole flight of November 28–29, 1929, and named by him for Rear Admiral William A. Moffett, U.S. Navy, first Chief of the Bureau of Aeronautics, Department of the Navy.

References

Glaciers of Amundsen Coast